Allah Verdi Kandi (also Romanized as Allāh Verdī Kandī; also known as Allāhverdī Kandī) is a village in Hajjilar-e Jonubi Rural District, Hajjilar District, Chaypareh County, West Azerbaijan Province, Iran. At the 2006 census, its population was 531, in 103 families.

References 

Populated places in Chaypareh County